Hu Xijin (born 7 April 1960) is a Chinese journalist and the former editor-in-chief and party secretary of the conservative popular media Global Times, a tabloid under the auspices of the Chinese Communist Party (CCP)'s official People's Daily newspaper. He has been accused by the western media of being a political propagandist and an early adopter of China's "wolf warrior" communication strategy of loudly denouncing perceived criticism of the Chinese government and its policies.

Early life and education
Hu was born in Beijing to a poor Christian family. After graduating with a master's degree in Russian literature from Beijing Foreign Studies University in 1989, Hu began his career as a journalist at the People's Daily. Hu took part in the 1989 Tiananmen Square protests but later in 2019 called the military action a tragedy caused by "student naivety" and government inexperience.

He can speak Chinese, English and Russian.

Career
Working as a foreign correspondent for the paper, he covered both the Bosnian War and the Iraq War. After covering Yugoslavia's break-up as a war correspondent, he came to admire strong Communist rule.

Hu became editor of the Global Times in 2005, editing both the Chinese-language version and, after its establishment in 2009, the English-language version. During Hu's time as editor of the Global Times, he has become known as a bellicose hard-liner. “Frisbee Hu,” a nickname for Hu Xijin, arose from a joke that he retrieves whatever the government throws at him.

Amid the 2020–2021 China–India skirmishes, Indian news site ThePrint called Hu Xijin "the Arnab Goswami of China" and said that both of them are also "mirror opposites" because "neither acknowledges the truth on the ground because it doesn’t suit their journalism".

Hu stepped down as editor-in-chief of the Global Times in December 2021. His departure, reportedly due to Beijing "strengthening the paper’s political guidance", was (according to The Diplomat) connected to efforts of toning down overly confrontational "wolf warrior" rhetoric, following a deterioration of China's international reputation and CCP general secretary Xi Jinping calling for improvements in the country's international communication at a May 2021 CCP Politburo session.

Accusations of "astroturfing"
According to Richard Burger, a former editor at the Global Times, in the wake of the arrest of Ai Weiwei, the Chinese staff of the Global Times were ordered by Hu to conduct an "astroturfing" campaign against Ai Weiwei in favor of the Chinese government's criticism of Ai as a "maverick".

Commentary surrounding 2019–20 Hong Kong protests
During the 2019–2020 Hong Kong protests, Hu urged for direct shooting towards the protesters. He also advocated that the police should be waived from any responsibilities even if the protesters were fatally shot. Hu warned that China would bar drafters of the Hong Kong Human Rights and Democracy Act, whose U.S. Senate sponsor is Florida Republican Marco Rubio, from entering mainland China as well as Hong Kong and Macau after U.S. President Trump signed it into law in November 2019. Hu compared the protesters to "ISIS-like terrorists", and accused the U.S. of instigating the protests.

Urging China to increase nuclear weapons

On 9 May 2020, Hu published an opinion piece urging the Chinese government to build more nuclear weapons, including 100 DF-41 intercontinental ballistic missiles.

Taiwan

Hu has supported an increase in hostility with Taiwan. Notably in 2020 he suggested that Chinese fighter jets should enter into Taiwan's claimed airspace and if shot down, consider it to be a declaration of war. In October 2021, he said, "The people of Taiwan will not follow the DPP and 'fight to the end.'"

In December 2021, Hu described Wang Leehom as "American Taiwanese", rather than Chinese, making a distinction between Taiwanese and Chinese.

In July 2022, Hu warned of military retaliation if Nancy Pelosi visited Taiwan, stating "I've conveyed the message: if the U.S. military sends fighter jets to escort Pelosi to Taiwan, then the move would take the vile nature of such a visit to another level, and would constitute aggression. Our fighter jets should deploy all obstructive tactics. If those are still ineffective, I think it is okay too to shoot down Pelosi's plane."

Personal life 
In October 2020, Apple Daily reported that Hu's son had emigrated to Canada, and that he was mocked for it by fellow news reporters; Hu denied that any of his children live abroad. Additionally, it was reported that Hu makes a salary of 570,000 yuan per year at his job at the Global Times, and an additional 12,000,000 yuan per year on digital platforms such as TikTok and Toutiao. Finally, it was also reported that Hu owns a luxury apartment worth 25,000,000 yuan.

In December 2020, South China Morning Post and Apple Daily reported that a former deputy editor at the Global Times submitted a complaint with the CCP's Central Commission for Discipline Inspection, alleging that Hu fathered two children with former colleagues. Hu denied the allegation and labeled it a blackmail attempt.

References

External links
 

1960 births
Living people
People's Republic of China journalists
Writers from Beijing
Beijing Foreign Studies University alumni
Propaganda in China
Conservatism in China